The National Technological University, Buenos Aires (Spanish: Universidad Tecnológica Nacional - Facultad Regional Buenos Aires), also called UTN-FRBA or UTN.BA, is the Buenos Aires-based regional faculty of the National Technological University.

It is the largest engineering college in Argentina and one of the most prestigious in the country.

In 2016 and 2019, the UTN.BA received the National Quality Award in the public sector, being the first public Faculty to receive this award, for its excellence in management models.

The college includes a main building and a postgraduate school in Almagro and a campus in Villa Lugano, both neighborhoods of Buenos Aires.

Programs

Engineering degrees
This college offers the following engineering degrees:
Engineer's degree in civil engineering
Engineer's degree in textile engineering
Engineer's degree in naval engineering
Engineer's degree in mechanical engineering
Engineer's degree in information systems (with an optional intermediate analyst's degree in systems)
Engineer's degree in industrial engineering
Engineer's degree in electric engineering
Engineer's degree in electronic engineering (with an optional intermediate technician's degree in electronics)
Engineer's degree in chemical engineering (with an optional intermediate technician's degree in chemistry)

Postgraduate degrees
 Master's
 Master's degree in business administration
 Master's degree in university education
 Master's degree in quality engineering
 Master's degree in engineering information systems
 Master's degree in ambiental engineering
 Master's degree in biotechnological processes
 Master's degree in food technology
 Master's degree in structural engineering
 Specializations
 Specialization in management engineering
 Specialization in university education
 Specialization in quality engineering
 Specialization in engineering information systems
 Specialization in ambiental engineering
 Specialization in laboural engineering
 Specialization in food technology
 Specialization in work hygiene and safety
 Specialization in telecommunications engineering
 PhD in engineering (signals & image processing)

Departments
 Department of Basic Sciences
 Department of Civil Engineering
 Department of Electrical Engineering
 Department of Electronic Engineering
 Department of Industrial Engineering
 Department of Mechanical Engineering
 Department of Naval Engineering
 Department of Chemical Engineering
 Department of Engineering Information Systems
 Department of Textil Engineering

Research Groups

GIBIO — Group for R&D in Bioengineering (Spanish: Grupo de Investigación y Desarrollo en Bioingeniería) 

Director: Dr. Ricardo Armentano    |    Coordinator: Dr. Leandro Cymberknop

The GIBIO is a multidisciplinary research group involving physicists, bioengineers, doctors and engineers of various disciplines. Also it consists of students, undergraduate and graduate scholars, and researchers mostly from the UTN.BA. The group functions in the field of bioengineering, especially within the branch of "Cardiovascular Engineering". It is located in the Main Building (Medrano 951, CABA) of the Buenos Aires Regional Faculty of National Technological University and depends on the Secretariat of Science, Technology and Productive Innovation (Spanish: Secretaría de Ciencia, Tecnología e Innovación Productiva, SeCTIP). The main objective of GIBIO is the study, research, development and evaluation of methods and equipment for the diagnosis and prevention, mostly of cardiovascular diseases, from its primitive genesis. Also GIBIO collaborates with several reputed international research entities to perform an intensive interdisciplinary research in the field of bioengineering.

Among its current lines of research and development, the key fields are bioinstrumentation, biomedical prototypes development, biomechanical studies of synthetic and biological prosthetics, computational numerical simulation, signal processing, medical image and data processing, big data analytics and internet of things applied to monitoring of cardiometabolic diseases.

CIIE — Research Centre for Innovative Education (Spanish: Centro de Investigación e Innovación Educativa)

History 

This UTN.BA is one of the 24 regional faculties of the National Technological University of Argentina.
Buenos Aires Regional Faculty (FRBA) Official website

Sources 

Buenos Aires
Education in Buenos Aires
Engineering universities and colleges in Argentina
Technical universities and colleges in Argentina